Joseph Toon (5 June 1879 – 7 March 1950) was an English cricketer. Toon was a right-handed batsman who bowled right-arm medium pace. He was born at Ratby, Leicestershire.

Toon made his first-class debut for Leicestershire against Derbyshire at Queen's Park, Chesterfield in the 1902 County Championship. He made nine further first-class appearances for the county, the last of which came against Derbyshire at Aylestone Road, Leicester in the 1909 County Championship. In his ten matches, he scored a total of 159 runs at an average of 10.60, with a high score of 39. With the ball, he took 10 wickets at a bowling average of 47.70, with best figures of 4/114.

He died at Braunstone, Leicestershire on 7 March 1950.

References

External links
Joseph Toon at Cricinfo
Joseph Toon at CricketArchive

1879 births
1950 deaths
People from Ratby
Cricketers from Leicestershire
English cricketers
Leicestershire cricketers